WhiteBox is a non-profit art space located in New York City. It hosts contemporary exhibitions, performance, video and special events including readings, lectures and panel discussions.

History
The organization was founded by Juan Puntes as an alternative art space for innovative, experimental and thought-provoking contemporary art. It was founded in Philadelphia in 1997, before relocating to Chelsea, New York City in 1998.

In the years 1998 and 1999, Whitebox was nominated for “Best Group Show” by the International Art Critics Association for "Plural Speech" and for a survey of Viennese Actionists, Hermann Nitsch and Günter Brus. Later exhibitions included artists Carolee Schneemann, Michael Snow, Dennins Oppenheim, Braco Dimitrijevic, Naoto Nagakawa, Alison Knowles, John Cage and Aldo Tambellini.

In 2008 WhiteBox decided to leave Chelsea to move to the Lower East Side, where a few galleries were just starting to settle following the opening of the New Museum in the same neighborhood.

In 2018 Mr. Puntes decided to move WhiteBox again and reopen it in  East Harlem, one of the largest predominantly Latino communities in New York City. Puntes was particularly interested in collaborating with immigrant and minority communities, especially Latin Americans. In addition Mr. Puntes was joined by curator Kyoko Sato who helped create an Asian art program

In January 2022 WhiteBox moved to its current location in the Lower East Side, Manhattan.

With Raul Zamudio as a curator, WhiteBox presented a series of socio-political commentary shows that involved local and international artists.

Mission
Whitebox works to present exhibitions that include the visual arts, experimental media, sound, poetry and video. It is committed to serving as an alternative space in which the general public and artistic community can explore, learn and engage with new ideas.

Events
In 2019, settled into its East Harlem location, White Box-Harlem presented the first mayor survey of Japanese experimental filmmaker Ko Nakajima in New York. Multiple screenings by the artist from the ‘60s to the ‘80s were shown. The exhibition received financial support from the Lower Manhattan Cultural Council.

In October 2021 an exhibition devoted to sound and multimedia art titled "White Noise" was presented. The show included a diverse group of international artists working on musical performance, video projection, poetry, installation and a live reading and screening of a graphic novel by indie-rocker and social critic, Jeffrey Lewis. Participating artists included Eva Petrič, V. Matt Sullivan and Beatrice A. Martino.

In November 2021 an international group exhibition titled "Perfect Day: Drugs and Art" was presented. It was curated by Raul Zamudio and Juan Puntes. Participating artists included Abdul Vas, Antonio Caro, Chin Chih Yang, Bradley Eros, Jason Mena, Javier Téllez, Julia Justo, Julia San Martin, Lorin Roser, Max Blagg,  Nina Kuo and Tamiko Kawata among others

References

External links

1998 establishments in New York City
Art galleries established in 1998

Contemporary art galleries in the United States